Francis S. Korkpor (born September 5, 1952) is a Liberian jurist and lawyer. He served as Chief Justice of Liberia from 2013 to 2022.

Early life and education 
Born in the town of Zao, Lao Clan, Nimba County, Liberia on September 5, 1952, Korkpor's career in public service and the law spans over three decades, and includes service as a private lawyer, prosecutor, and Supreme Court Justice.

He earned his bachelor of arts at the University of Liberia in 1976 before going on to earn his criminal justice degree from the North Carolina Justice Academy in the United States of America from 1977-1978. He returned to Liberia after completing his criminal justice program and enrolled at the UL Louis Arthur Grimes School of Law where he graduated in 1982 with a bachelor of laws degree.

Career
Korkpor entered government as a prosecuting attorney in 1982, the same year he graduated from the Law School. While serving at the Ministry of Justice, he aggressively prosecuted repeated offenders, violent criminals, and public officials who committed ethical defilements or indecencies. His untiring work as a prosecutor in the Department of Litigation earned him promotion to the posts of Assistant Minister for Economic Affairs in 1985, and Assistant Minister for Legal Affairs in 1988. He served in the latter position until the beginning of the civil war, which forced him to travel to the United States, where he pursued advanced legal education.

Having gained experience in practice as a Counsellor during the early 1980s, Korkpor resigned from government and established the Tiala Law Firm in Monrovia. As a busy private lawyer, Korkpor was a testament to his ability to provide sound legal services to the people of Liberia; especially human rights organizations and journalists who were targets of the erstwhile government of Charles Taylor. He also represented the legal interests of several other organizations like the Catholic Church of Liberia. During the period of private practice, Korkpor established himself as one of Liberia’s foremost legal minds and built partnerships and maintains collegiality within the Liberian National Bar Association (LNBA).

Korkpor has pursued a reform agenda for strengthening the third branch of the Liberian government in a number of key areas:
Office of the Court Administrator
Creation of the Office of Court Inspectors
The Judiciary Inquiry Commission & the Grievance and Ethics Committee
Record keeping and Information Technology
Regional Justice and Security Hubs
Infrastructure
Judicial Training Institute

In September 2022, Korkpor planned to retire as chief justice in due to his turning 70 years old, the maximum age for a Liberian supreme court justice as specified in the constitution. On September 27, Korkpor announced his retirement.

Legal experience

Chief Justice, Supreme Court of Liberia
Nominated and confirmed in April 2013; seating on April 18, 2013 to September 27, 2022
Associate Justice, Supreme Court of Liberia January 4, 2004 to April 17, 2013
Associate Professor, Louis Arthur Grimes School of Law, University of Liberia 2009-2010
Assistant Minister, Legal Affairs, Ministry of Justice 1988-1990
Assistant Minister, Economic Affairs, Ministry of Justice 1985-1988
Assistant Minister, Litigation, Ministry of Justice 1976-1985

Education

Bachelor of Arts, Sociology, 1976, University of Liberia, Monrovia
Criminal Justice diploma, 1978, North Carolina Justice Academy, United States of America
Bachelor of Law, 1982, Louis Arthur Grimes School of Law, University of Liberia, Monrovia

Professional

Member, West Africa Judges Association (WAJA) 
Member, Chief Justices’   Judicial Council, ECOWAS Community Court of Justice                                                 
Member, Liberia National Bar Association (LNBA)

Personal

Born in Zao Town, Lao Clan, Nimba County, Liberia and raised in Sanniquellie, Nimba County, Liberia

Religious Organizations
Member, Knights of Marshall
Member, St. Anthony Catholic Church, Monrovia

Children
Francis Jr., Tom-Wesley, Michael, Tiala, Wuo-Victor, Wendell Sei Korkpor

References

Living people
1952 births
Chief justices of Liberia
People from Nimba County
University of Liberia alumni
Academic staff of the University of Liberia
21st-century Liberian judges